Nanpantan Reservoir is a reservoir in Leicestershire, near Nanpantan. It is owned by Severn Trent.

References 

Reservoirs in Leicestershire